John Brinsley Sheridan (January 22, 1870 – April 14, 1930) was an Irish American sportswriter.

Born in County Meath, Ireland, Sheridan was the son of Richard and Rosetta (née O'Reilly) Sheridan. He came to the United States when he was 18 years old.

Sheridan was an accomplished sports journalist in St. Louis newspapers from 1888 through 1929, while his column for Sporting News "Back of Home Plate", published between 1917 and 1929, earned him national respect as a baseball writer. In addition, he wrote with authority about American football, boxing and golf, among other sports.

By 1921 he was named chairman of the Missouri Committee on Public Utility Information. While on the committee he became a whistleblower about some dishonest and illegal activities in the department, and decided to submit his resignation. He soon suffered a nervous breakdown because of the affair and underwent medical care in sanitarium, but never recovered.

Sheridan died in 1930 in St. Louis, Missouri, at the age of 59. He was found hanging in his room at Alexian Brothers Hospital by a bathrobe cord.

Sixteen years later, Sheridan became one of 12 writers who were honored by the Baseball Hall of Fame on a Roll of Honor in its Class of 1946.

References

1870 births
1930 deaths
Baseball writers
American sportswriters
Irish emigrants to the United States (before 1923)
People from County Meath
Death in Missouri
Deaths by hanging